Snigdha Haque is a Bangladesh Nationalist Party politician and the former Member of Bangladesh Parliament of women's reserved seat.

Career
Haque was elected to parliament from women's reserved seat as a Bangladesh Nationalist Party candidate in 1979.

References

Bangladesh Nationalist Party politicians
Living people
2nd Jatiya Sangsad members
Women members of the Jatiya Sangsad
Year of birth missing (living people)
20th-century Bangladeshi women politicians